Lawrence Collier Jr. (born September 12, 1995) is an American football defensive end for the Seattle Seahawks of the National Football League (NFL). He played college football at TCU, and was drafted by the Seahawks in the 1st round of the 2019 NFL Draft.

Early years
Collier grew up in his father's hometown of Munday, Texas. He attended Munday High School, where he helped lead the Moguls to a state championship as a junior in 2012. He recorded six tackles, a sack, a forced fumble, and a touchdown on an interception return to earn Defensive MVP honors for the game.

On February 5, 2014, he signed a letter of intent to attend Texas Christian University in Fort Worth, Texas on a football scholarship.

College career
Collier redshirted during his first season at TCU, but became a starter for the Horned Frogs as a redshirt freshman in 2015 despite appearing in just one game.  He played in all 13 games for the Horned Frogs as sophomore, recording 4.5 sacks and blocking a field goal against Georgia in the 2016 Liberty Bowl. He recorded 4.5 sacks again as a junior, including one in a crucial late-game situation in the Frogs' comeback win  over Stanford in the 2017 Alamo Bowl.

As a senior in 2018, Collier finally got the opportunity to become a starter for the Horned Frogs.  He responded by tallying 6.0 sacks, 11.5 tackles for loss and 4 pass break-ups to earn First-team All-Big 12 honors and closed out his collegiate career with a sack in TCU's Cheez-It Bowl victory over California.

Following his senior season, Collier graduated from TCU and was invited to participate in the 2019 Senior Bowl, in which he recorded a sack and a forced fumble.

Professional career

2019
Collier was selected by the Seattle Seahawks in the first round (29th overall) of the 2019 NFL Draft. The Seahawks traded Frank Clark to the Kansas City Chiefs in order to obtain the selection used to select Collier.   After suffering multiple injuries, he finished the season with 3 tackles.

2020
Collier started the 2020 campaign as the starting defensive end for the Seattle Seahawks after the departure of Jadeveon Clowney.  He had the biggest play of his early career when he stopped New England Patriots quarterback Cam Newton on the 1-yard line to secure a Week 2 35–30 victory on Sunday Night Football.
In Week 5 against the Minnesota Vikings on Sunday Night Football, Collier recorded his first career sack on Kirk Cousins during the 27–26 win. In Week 11 against the Arizona Cardinals on Thursday Night Football, Collier recorded his second career sack, taking down Kyler Murray during a 28-21 win.

2022
The Seahawks declined the fifth-year option on Collier's rookie contract making him a free agent after the 2022 season. Collier was placed on injured reserve to start the season. He was activated on October 26.

References

External links
TCU Horned Frogs bio

1995 births
Living people
People from Munday, Texas
Players of American football from Texas
American football defensive ends
TCU Horned Frogs football players
Seattle Seahawks players